R. T. Inbathamilan is an Indian politician and former Member of the Legislative Assembly. He was elected to the Tamil Nadu legislative assembly as an Anna Dravida Munnetra Kazhagam candidate from Srivilliputhur constituency in 2001 election.

References 

All India Anna Dravida Munnetra Kazhagam politicians
Living people
Year of birth missing (living people)